Nevada City is a ghost town in Churchill County, Nevada, United States, located just east of Fallon, Nevada near the current intersection of State Route 118 and U.S. Highway 50. It was founded in 1916 as a socialist community known as the Nevada Cooperative Colony, but due to misleading advertising, mismanagement, and possibly dubious financial dealings by the Nevada Colony Corporation's directors, who were connected with the similar Llano del Rio colony near Los Angeles, the project folded in 1919. Another contributing factor to its demise was the unpopularity of its anti-war position during World War I, which led to bloodshed when Churchill County Sheriff Mark Wildes attempted to arrest colonist Paul Walters as a draft evader. By 1919 most of the families had moved away and the colony fell into receivership.

References

Ghost towns in Churchill County, Nevada
Ghost towns in Nevada